Johovac is a village in the municipality of Bijeljina, Bosnia and Herzegovina.

Notable people
Savo Milošević

References

Villages in Republika Srpska
Populated places in Bijeljina